OFI Crete seasons.

Seasons

Overall seasons table

External links
Rec.Sport.Soccer Statistics Foundation

 
OFI Crete